The American Trotting Classic at Hollywood Park Racetrack in Inglewood, California is a defunct three-race series in harness racing for Standardbred trotters aged three and older. It was run annually between 1955 and 1981 at three different racetracks with the final hosted by Hollywood Park Racetrack.   During the same period, these tracks also offered the corresponding American Pacing Classic.

The race was run at a distance of one mile from 1955 through 1960, after which it was run at a mile and an eighth.

The American Trotting Classic replaced the Golden West Trot which had been contested from 1946 through 1954 under the auspices of the Western Harness Racing Association at both Santa Anita Park and at Hollywood Park.

Historical race events
In 1955, Scott Frost capped off a brilliant season of racing when he took the first of his consecutive wins in the American Trotting Classic, and in both 1955 and 1956 he was voted Harness Horse of the Year. Earlier in 1955, Scott Frost had become the first horse to win the U.S. Trotting Triple Crown.

In addition to back-to-back wins by Scott Frost in 1955 and 1956 and Savoir in 1974 and 1975, two other horses have also won the race twice. Fresh Yankee accomplished the feat in 1969 and again in 1971, plus Dayan in 1970 and 1972.

Hall of Fame driver/trainer Joe O'Brien won the American Trotting Classic six times, which was the most by any trainer as well as by any driver. In addition, O'Brien drove to victory in the American Pacing Classic a record four times.

Records
 Most wins by a driver 
 6 – Joe O'Brien (1955, 1966, 1965, 1969, 1971, 1977)

 Most wins by a trainer
 6 – Joe O'Brien (1955, 1966, 1965, 1969, 1971, 1977)

 Stakes record
 2:11 3/5 – Classical Way (1980) at 1 1/8 miles
 1:57 3/5  – Senator Frost (1959) at 1 mile

Winners of the American Trotting Classic

References

Hollywood Park Racetrack
Harness races in the United States
Sports competitions in Inglewood, California
Recurring sporting events established in 1955
1955 establishments in California
1981 disestablishments in California
Recurring sporting events disestablished in 1981